Gina Philips (née Consolo; born May 10, 1970) is an American actress. She had recurring roles on David E. Kelley's Ally McBeal, as Sandy Hingle, and Boston Public, as Jenna Miller. She is perhaps best known as Trish Jenner in the horror film Jeepers Creepers (2001). She reprised her role in a cameo in Jeepers Creepers 3 (2017).

Early life and education
Philips was born in Miami Beach, Florida, to an Italian father and an Ashkenazi Jewish mother. She attended the University of Pennsylvania but dropped out halfway through her senior year, in order to pursue acting. However, they allowed her to walk through graduation with the rest of her graduating class since she was only one class shy. Philips is known for her recurring roles on David E. Kelley's Ally McBeal as Sandy Hingle and Boston Public as Jenna Miller. She has also made guest appearances on Star Trek: DS9, Sliders, ER, CSI, Medium and Monk.

Career

Philips landed her first supporting film role in Deadly Invasion: The Killer Bee Nightmare. It aired on the Fox Network on March 7, 1995. In 1996, Philips had a small role in Unforgivable as Tammy, the daughter of an abusive father. The film premiered on April 30, 1996, on CBS, and received little to no critical acclaim. In 1997, Philips played her first lead role in Born Into Exile as Holly, a 14-year-old runaway.

In 2001, Philips was cast as a lead in the 2001 horror film Jeepers Creepers. The film received mixed reviews from critics. In 2003, Philips was originally going to appear again as Trish Jenner in Jeepers Creepers 2, as the plot was about her character and Patricia Belcher's character hunting down The Creeper, but the plot changed considerably during script rewrites, with Philips turning down what had become a minor role.
Her next film was the American comedy drama The Anarchist Cookbook, which received mostly negative reviews.

In 2004, she starred in the low budget horror films Dead & Breakfast and Jennifer's Shadow. In 2006, Philips again played a lead in a low-budget horror film, Ring Around the Rosie as a young woman plagued by horrible visions and dreams of tragic past events while spending time at her grandparents' secluded summerhouse. The next year she starred in the horror film The Sickhouse and the Lifetime television film My Baby Is Missing. The film was released as a DVD under the title Stolen Innocence on 7 January 2010.

In 2011, she began work on the Jennifer Lynch film Chained (previously titled Rabbit) a Canadian psychological thriller filmed in Regina, Saskatchewan and released in 2012.

She reprised her previous role, in a brief cameo, in the third Jeepers Creepers film, Jeepers Creepers 3. Shooting began in Louisiana in February 2017, and the film was released in September of that year.

Filmography

Films

TV series

References

External links
 

1975 births
American film actresses
American television actresses
American people of Italian descent
American people of Jewish descent
Actresses from Florida
Living people
20th-century American actresses
21st-century American actresses
People from Miami Beach, Florida